Waterford is a town in Saratoga County, New York, United States. The population was 8,423 at the 2010 census. The name of the town is derived from its principal village, also called Waterford.  The town is located in the southeast corner of Saratoga County and north-northwest of Troy at the junction of the Erie Canal and the Hudson River.

History 
The village of Waterford is the oldest incorporated village in the United States, having been incorporated in 1794 before the town was formed.  Waterford has been host to "Canal Fest" and "Tugboat Roundup" celebrations for many years.

The town of Waterford was formed from the town of Halfmoon in 1816.

The  Northside Historic District, Ormsby-Laughlin Textile Companies Mill, Peebles (Peobles) Island, and Waterford Village Historic District are listed on the National Register of Historic Places.

Geography

According to the United States Census Bureau, the town has a total area of 7.4 square miles (19.2 km2), of which 6.6 square miles (17.0 km2)  is land and 0.9 square mile (2.2 km2)  (11.59%) is water.

The eastern town line, defined by the Hudson River, is the border with Rensselaer County, and the southern town line, defined by the Mohawk River, is the border with Albany County. The easternmost section and locks of the Erie Canal pass through the town and connect with the Hudson River. The Waterford Flight series of locks is one of the steepest in the world.

Demographics

As of the 2010 census, there were 8,423 residents of the Town of Waterford. The racial makeup of the town was 94.8% White, 1.3% African-American, 0.1% Native American, and 1.5% Asian; in addition, 1.8% of residents were Hispanic or Latino.

Communities and locations in the town of Waterford 
Cohoes Falls – A waterfall on the Mohawk River, and a source of water power to early industry
Peebles Island – An island at the south part of the town
Momentive Performance Materials Inc. (formerly General Electric Silicone Products) – Manufacturer of silicone products and specialty chemicals, may be largest employer in the town
Northside – Actually the south side of the town of Waterford. The name may be derived from its location on the north side of the Mohawk River. Northside may also derive its name from at one time being served by the "northside" part of the Cohoes Post Office (e.g. 123 Any Street, Northside, Cohoes, NY).  After around 1960, all of Waterford was served by the Waterford Post Office.
Peebles Island State Park – A state park in the south part of the town
Prospect Hill – A hamlet north of Waterford village, on County Road 96
State Canal Park – A state park in the western part of Waterford
Sugarloaf Pond – A pond in the south part of the town
Waterford Village – The village of Waterford, located within the Town, and right at the confluence of the Hudson and Mohawk Rivers
St. Mary's of the Assumption Catholic Church
St. Mary's of the Assumption Catholic School

See also
New York State Canal System
Northside Historic District (Waterford, New York)
Waterford Village Historic District (Waterford, New York)

References

External links

 Town of Waterford
 Waterford Historical Museum
 The Saratogian, "Early History of Waterford", Our county and its people: A descriptive and biographical record of Saratoga County, New York. Boston: The Boston History Company, 1899, reproduced on Rays Place website
 Waterford Public Library

Towns in Saratoga County, New York
Populated places on the Mohawk River